The DJ in the Mix is the debut compilation album by German DJ André Tanneberger, better known as ATB.  The compilation includes 32 tracks of new and previously released trance from well-known international musicians in the genre, such as Paul van Dyk, Chicane, Armin van Buuren, Binary Finary, Woody van Eyden, 2 Trance, and ATB himself.

Track listing

Disc One 
 ATB - In Love with the DJ (New Vocal Clubb Mix)
 Darren Tate vs. Jono Grant - Nocturnal Creatures (Jono Grant Remix)
 Paul van Dyk featuring Vega 4 - Time of Our Lives (PvD Club Mix)
 Ayu - M (Van Eyden vs. M.O.R.P.H Remix)
 All Grace featuring Mr Sam & Rani - Surrender (Original Mix)
 Armin van Buuren featuring Airwave - Slipstream
 Farrago - Union (1st Clubb Mix)
 Jushi - Requiem (Vectrex Remix)
 Rusch & Murray - Epic (Above & Beyond Remix)
 Everything But The Girl - Missing (Todd Terry Club Mix)
 ATB - 9pm (Till I Come) (Sequential One Remix)
 Aalto - Rush (Super 8 vs. Orkidea Remix)
 Woody van Eyden - Unfinished Symphony (Funaki Remix)
 Ron van den Beuken - Timeless (Original Mix)
 Scott Mac vs. AJ Gibson - Twilight (Woody van Eyden Remix)
 Salt Lake - Sunset Highway (Original Mix)

Disc Two
 ATB - Sunset Girl (Limited Club Mix)
 Blank & Jones - Summer Sun (Original Mix)
 Mirco de Govia - Final Emotion
 Wellenrausch - On The Run (M.O.R.P.H vs. van Eyden Experience Mix)
 Humate - Love Stimulation (Original Mix)
 Alex M.O.R.P.H - Flaming Clouds (Instrumental Mix)
 ATB - I Don't Wanna Stop (Kenny Hayes Sunrise Remix)
 Binary Finary - 1998 (Ronski Speed Remix)
 2 Trance - In My Dreams (M.O.R.P.H vs. van Eyden Remix)
 Chicane - Daylight (ATB Remix)
 Schiller - Liebe (with Mila Mar) (ATB Dub Remix)
 Starshine - Melodic
 Fractals - Lifelab
 Rapid Eye - Stealing Beauty
 Metalmaster - Is This Hard Enough (Spanish Fly Mix)
 Mac Zimms - L'Annonce Des Couleurs 2003 (The Mystery Remix)

Disc Three (Limited Edition Chill CD)
 9pm (Till I Come) (Bent Mix)
 Enigmatic Encounter
 Remember
 Get High
 Trilogy
 Everything Is Wrong
 We Belong
 First Love

ATB albums
DJ mix albums
2003 compilation albums